Hilary Dawn Cass  is a British medical doctor and a consultant in paediatric disability at St Thomas' Hospital, London. She was the President of the Royal College of Paediatrics and Child Health from 2012 to 2015.

Early life
She was educated at the City of London School for Girls. She studied at the Royal Free hospital medical school, graduating with a degree in medicine.

From 1994 to 2009 she was a consultant in paediatric disability at Great Ormond Street Hospital (GOSH). She left after raising concerns about patient safety at the hospital.

Honours and awards
She accepted an OBE in 2015 for services to child health.

The Royal College of Nursing awarded her an honorary fellowship in 2015.

In September 2020, she accepted to lead the independent Cass Review for the NHS into gender identity services for children and young people.

The interim report of the Cass Review was published in March 2022. It said that the rise in referrals had led to the staff being overwhelmed, and recommended the creation of a network of regional hubs to provide care and support to young people. The report noted that the clinical approach used by GIDS "has not been subjected to some of the usual control measures" typically applied with new treatments, and raised concerns about the lack of data collection by GIDS.

References

 

 
 
 

Living people
English women medical doctors
British paediatricians
Women pediatricians
20th-century English medical doctors
21st-century English medical doctors
Alumni of the UCL Medical School
Officers of the Order of the British Empire
20th-century women physicians
21st-century women physicians
Year of birth missing (living people)
Physicians of Great Ormond Street Hospital
People educated at the City of London School for Girls
20th-century English women
20th-century English people
21st-century English women